Muhammad Azzizan bin Nordin (born 3 July 1994) is a Malaysian professional footballer who plays as a midfielder for Malaysia Super League club Negeri Sembilan.

Club career
Azzizan start his professional career with Harimau Muda squad that playing in Malaysia Premier League. He later spent two season playing in the Singapore's S-League with Harimau Muda. After the disband of Harimau Muda, he signed a contract with Sabah for 2014 seasons and played in the President's Cup with Sabah U-21.

He made his debut for Sabah senior side in the opening match of 2015 Malaysia Premier League against Kuala Lumpur at the Merdeka Stadium where Sabah won 2-0. Since then, he was a regular for Sabah and appointed as the vice captain besides Rawilson Batuil. He won the Malaysia Premier League title with Sabah in 2019.

International career
Azzizan received his first national called up in 2018 by Tan Cheng Hoe for friendly match against Chinese Taipei and Cambodia. He made his debut on 10 September 2018 in the match against Cambodia where he came in as substitute in the 1st half replacing Nasir Basharudin.

Honours
Sabah
 Malaysia Premier League: 2019

References

External links
 Football Malaysia Profile
 

1994 births
Living people
Malaysian footballers
People from Sabah
Sabah F.C. (Malaysia) players
Association football midfielders